The 1957 Eastern Illinois Panthers football team represented Eastern Illinois University as a member of the Interstate Intercollegiate Athletic Conference (IIAC) during the 1957 NCAA College Division football season. The team was led by first-year head coach Ralph Kohl and played their home games at Lincoln Field in Charleston, Illinois. The Panthers lost every game they played, finishing the season with a 0–8 record overall and a 0–6 record in conference play.

Schedule

References

Eastern Illinois
Eastern Illinois Panthers football seasons
College football winless seasons
Eastern Illinois Panthers football